This list of science and technology awards for women is an index to articles about notable awards made to women for work in science and the STEM (Science, technology, engineering, and mathematics) fields generally. It includes awards for astronomy, space and atmospheric science; biology and medicine; chemistry; engineering; mathematics; neuroscience; physics; technology; and general or multiple fields.

Astronomy, space, atmospheric science
 Annie Jump Cannon Award in Astronomy – annual award for outstanding contributions to astronomy by a woman within five years of earning a doctorate degree
 Peter B. Wagner Memorial Award for Women in Atmospheric Sciences – awarded annually since 1998, based on paper completion, to a woman studying for a Masters or PhD in atmospheric science at a university in the United States

Biology and medicine
 Elizabeth Blackwell Medal, given by the American Medical Women's Association to a woman physician "who has made the most outstanding contributions to the cause of women in the field of medicine"
 Federation of American Societies for Experimental Biology (FASEB) Excellence in Science Award
 Group on Women in Medicine and Science Leadership Awards, Association of American Medical Colleges
 Margaret Oakley Dayhoff Award from the Biophysical Society, Rockville, Maryland - given to a woman who "has achieved prominence for 'substantial contributions to science'" and showing high promise in the early part of her career
 Pearl Meister Greengard Prize – established 2004
 WICB Junior and Senior Awards from Women in Cell Biology (WICB)

Chemistry
 ACS Award for Encouraging Women into Careers in the Chemical Sciences, sponsored by the Camille and Henry Dreyfus Foundation
 Garvan-Olin Medal – annual award that recognizes distinguished service to chemistry by women chemists
 Awards by the Iota Sigma Pi honorary society for women in chemistry:
 Agnes Fay Morgan Research Award
 Anna Louise Hoffman Award for Outstanding Achievement in Graduate Research
 Centennial Award for Excellence in Undergraduate Teaching
 Gladys Anderson Emerson Undergraduate Scholarship
 Members-at-Large Re-entry Award
 National Honorary Member
 Outstanding Young Women in Chemistry award.
 Undergraduate Excellence in Chemistry
 Violet Diller Professional Excellence Award

Engineering
 Sharon Keillor Award for Women in Engineering Education
 Achievement Award of the Society of Women Engineers
 Young Woman Engineer of the Year Award

Mathematics
 Awards by the Association for Women in Mathematics:
 Alice T. Schafer Prize – established 1991
 Biographies of Contemporary Women in Mathematics Essay Contest – established in 2001 for biographical essays
 Emmy Noether Lectures – an honorary lecture award
 M. Gweneth Humphreys Award
 Louise Hay Award for Contributions to Mathematics Education – established 1991
 Ruth I. Michler Memorial Prize
 Ruth Lyttle Satter Prize in Mathematics – established 1990
 additional awards by the AWM
 Awards sponsored by the Kovalevskaia Fund in Mexico, Peru, and southern Africa
 Krieger–Nelson Prize for Distinguished Research by Women in Mathematics – established 1995 by the Canadian Mathematical Society

Neuroscience
 Awards by the Society for Neuroscience:
 Bernice Grafstein Award for Outstanding Accomplishments in Mentoring – for dedication to mentoring women neuroscientists
 Louise Hanson Marshall Special Recognition Award – honors an individual who has significantly promoted the professional development of women in neuroscience through teaching, organizational leadership, public advocacy, or other efforts that are not necessarily related to research
 Mika Salpeter Lifetime Achievement Award – presented for outstanding career achievements in neuroscience who has also significantly promoted the professional advancement of women in neuroscience
 Patricia Goldman-Rakic Hall of Honor – posthumously recognizes a neuroscientist who has pursued career excellence and exhibited dedication and advancement of women in neuroscience

Physics
 Jocelyn Bell Burnell Medal and Prize, Institute of Physics

Technology
 BlackBerry Women and Technology Awards
 WITI@UC Athena Awards - Awards recognize those who embody, encourage, and promote the inclusion of women in technology. Awardees are leaders who inspire others to pursue and persist in technical careers.
 Lori Bunch "Recognized for Innovation in Cerner Millennium Implementation." She started with Cerner as an installation director then was promoted to senior project architect in 1997. She continues to be an innovator in the information technology industry.

General or multiple fields
 Awards by the Association for Women in Science:
Leadership Award
 Kirsten R. Lorentzen Award – for undergraduates in science
Next Generation Award
Pinnacle Award
 Amelia Earhart Fellowship
 Athena SWAN – a recognition scheme for UK universities working to advance and promote careers of women in science, engineering, and technology
 scholarships for women in science by Brookhaven Women in Science:
 Renate W. Chasman Scholarship – awarded to a graduate student performing research at Brookhaven National Laboratory
 Gertrude S. Goldhaber Prize – awarded to a graduate student at Stony Brook University and/or performing thesis research at Brookhaven National Laboratory
Edison Awards – Honoring excellence in innovation
Edith D. Hendley Award – for a woman pursuing graduate studies at the University of Vermont
 Elizabeth Blackwell Award – given by Hobart and William Smith Colleges, established in 1958
 Elsevier Foundation Awards for Early-Career Women Scientists in the Developing World
 Faculty for the Future Fellowships – awarded by the Schlumberger Foundation to women from developing and emerging economies who are preparing for PhD or post-doctoral study in the physical sciences and engineering
 Katharine F. Erskine Award for Medicine and Science
 Kovalevskaia prizes sponsored by the Kovalevskaia Fund in Vietnam and Cuba
 L'Oréal-UNESCO Awards for Women in Science, aka the Helena Rubinstein Women in Science Awards
 Margaret W. Rossiter History of Women in Science Prize – established in 1987 by the History of Science Society
 Maria Mitchell Women in Science Award – from the Maria Mitchell Association "to recognize an individual whose efforts have encouraged the advancement of girls and women in the natural and physical sciences, mathematics, engineering, computer science and technology"
 Mariafranca Morselli Award – for a woman pursuing undergraduate studies in science at the University of Vermont
 Outstanding Women in Science Award – established 2002 by the Korea Science and Engineering Foundation
 Rachel Carson Prize – Norwegian prize for women environmentalists
 Robin Copeland Memorial Fellowship – fellowship from CRDF Global for women leaders in emerging countries
 Saruhashi Prize – an award for Japanese women researchers in the natural sciences
 South African Awards for Women in Science (SAWiSA)
 Tagea Brandt Rejselegat – Danish award for women who have made significant contributions in science, literature, or art
 Weizmann Women & Science Award
 Women in Technology International (WITI) Hall of Fame
 Women of Discovery Award by WINGS WorldQuest
 Special VinFuture Prize for a female author of research or invention by Vingroup.

See also
 List of organizations for women in science
 Lists of science and technology awards
 Lists of awards

References

External links
 AAAS Women's International Science Collaboration

 
Prizes, medals, and awards for women
Women in science
Awards
Technology
Health care by city